Vladimír Frák (born 15 August 1961) is a Slovak skier. He competed in the Nordic combined event at the 1984 Winter Olympics.

References

External links
 

1961 births
Living people
Slovak male Nordic combined skiers
Olympic Nordic combined skiers of Czechoslovakia
Nordic combined skiers at the 1984 Winter Olympics
People from Levoča
Sportspeople from the Prešov Region